"Liverpool (We're Never Gonna...)" was a single released by the English football team Liverpool in 1983, as a double A-side with "Liverpool Anthem".  It reached number 54 in the UK Singles Chart.

References

1983 singles
Liverpool F.C. songs